Fluocinolone acetonide is a corticosteroid primarily used in dermatology to reduce skin inflammation and relieve itching. It is a synthetic hydrocortisone derivative. The fluorine substitution at position 9 in the steroid nucleus greatly enhances its activity. It was first synthesized in 1959 in the Research Department of Syntex Laboratories S.A. Mexico City. Preparations containing it were first marketed under the name Synalar. A typical dosage strength used in dermatology is 0.01–0.025%. One such cream is sold under the brand name Flucort-N and includes the antibiotic neomycin.

Fluocinolone acetonide was also found to strongly potentiate TGF-β-associated chondrogenesis of bone marrow mesenchymal stem/progenitor cells, by increasing the levels of collagen type II by more than 100 fold compared to the widely used dexamethasone.

Fluocinolone acetonide intravitreal implants have been used to treat non-infectious uveitis. A systematic review could not determine whether fluocinolone acetonide implants are superior to standard of care treatment for uveitis. A fluocinolone acetonide intravitreal implant with the brand name Iluvien is sold by biopharmaceutical company Alimera Sciences to treat diabetic macular edema (DME).

It was approved for medical use in 1961.

Classification
Fluocinolone is a group V (0.025%) or group VI (0.01%) corticosteroid under US classification.

See also
 Topical steroid
 Fluocinonide
 Ciprocinonide
 Glucocorticoid

References

External links 
 

Acetonides
Corticosteroid cyclic ketals
Corticosteroids
Diketones
Diols
Fluoroarenes
Glucocorticoids
Otologicals
Substances discovered in the 1950s